John Fletcher is an American former ice hockey goaltender and coach who was an All-American for Clarkson.

Career
Fletcher was an instant hit for Clarkson, taking over the starting role as a freshman. He recorded 4 shutouts and was named ECAC Hockey Rookie of the Year. The team in front of him was average at best and finished in the middle of the conference, losing in the first round of the ECAC Tournament, but that didn't stop Fletcher from being drafted by the Vancouver Canucks after the season. Fletcher was just as good the following year and was named an All-American. He backstopped the Golden Knights to an upset win over top-seeded Harvard in the conference semifinals and was named as the top goalie of the tournament.

After new head coach Mark Morris arrived in 1988, Fletcher saw his numbers worsen and his time in goal was reduced. Despite this, Clarkson finished 4th in the conference, their best result to date with Fletcher. Unfortunately, the team couldn't use home ice to its advantage and lost in the first round. Fletcher rebounded as a senior and won 20 games, getting the Golden Knights into the NCAA Tournament for the first time in six years. Clarkson was easily dispatched by Minnesota and Fletcher's college career came to a close.

After graduating, Fletcher played two seasons of professional hockey but he found little success. He played exclusively at the ECHL level and ended up with 5 different teams in that span. He finally began to produce good numbers in his last stop with the Johnstown Chiefs, but it wasn't enough to keep him in the game and he retired in 1992.

Fletcher tried his hand at coaching next, serving as an assistant at several colleges over an 8-year span. In his final stop with Nebraska–Omaha, Fletcher also worked as an HVAC Comfort Advisor. He retired from coaching in 2002 and became a sales manager, working for several companies over the next 15 years. In 2018, Fletcher became a sales director for EyeGuide, a position he holds as of 2021.

Statistics

Regular season and playoffs

Awards and honors

References

External links

1967 births
Living people
AHCA Division I men's ice hockey All-Americans
American men's ice hockey goaltenders
Ice hockey coaches from Massachusetts
Sportspeople from Newton, Massachusetts
Clarkson Golden Knights men's ice hockey players
Winston-Salem Thunderbirds players
Cincinnati Cyclones players
Nashville Knights players
Knoxville Cherokees players
Johnstown Chiefs players
Vancouver Canucks draft picks
Ice hockey players from Massachusetts